Carlos Blanco Moreno (born 1 June 1996) is a Spanish footballer who plays for Marbella FC as a central defender.

Club career
Born in Barcelona, Catalonia, Blanco joined FC Barcelona's prolific youth setup in 2006, after representing UE Cornellà and RCD Espanyol. On 18 July 2014, after cutting ties with Barça, he joined Juventus F.C. on a free transfer.

On 30 August 2016, Blanco was loaned to Swiss Super League side FC Lausanne-Sport for one year, with Andi Zeqiri moving in the opposite direction. He made his senior debut on 16 September, starting in a 1–3 Swiss Cup away loss against FC Köniz; it was his maiden appearance for the club.

On 11 July 2017, Blanco signed a two-year contract with Segunda División club Gimnàstic de Tarragona. He made his professional debut on 5 September, starting in a 1–1 Copa del Rey home draw against CD Lugo (1–3 loss on penalties).

On 11 January 2018, Blanco was loaned to Betis Deportivo Balompié until June. On 10 July, he terminated his contract with Nàstic, and signed for Villarreal CF B two days later.

References

External links

1996 births
Living people
Footballers from Barcelona
Spanish footballers
Association football defenders
Segunda División players
Segunda División B players
Gimnàstic de Tarragona footballers
Betis Deportivo Balompié footballers
Villarreal CF B players
Marbella FC players
Juventus F.C. players
FC Lausanne-Sport players
Spanish expatriate footballers
Spanish expatriate sportspeople in Italy
Spanish expatriate sportspeople in Switzerland
Expatriate footballers in Italy
Expatriate footballers in Switzerland